Haji Shariatullah (17811840) was a prominent religious leader and Islamic scholar from Bengal in the eastern subcontinent, who is best known as the founder of the Faraizi movement. In 1884, the Shariatpur District was formed and named after him.

Early life
Shariatullah is generally acknowledged to have been born into a Bengali Muslim family of Taluqdars in Char Shamail, a village in present-day Shibchar, Madaripur. The exact date or time of his birth and the name of his mother has not been mentioned by any peer-reviewed historical text, but some have estimated it to be circa 1781 CE. Coming from a family with no high educational background, his father was Abd al-Jalil Taluqdar, a landowner who had farming as his primary source of income.

At around eight years old, Shariatullah lost his father and was then taken care of by his uncle, Azim ad-Din, who nurtured him in a very loving manner and made Shariatullah's youth "carefree" with little concern for discipline. However, when he reached the age of twelve, Shariatullah ran away to Calcutta supposedly due to being reprimanded by his uncle on a certain occasion. There, he met a Quran teacher known as Maulana Basharat Ali who subsequently enrolled Shariatullah into his classes. Ali had a crucial impact on the direction of Shariatullah's life, encouraging him to study the Arabic and Persian languages, something that would later allow him to respectively develop a comprehensive understanding of Islamic texts and master the lingua franca of the subcontinent. Shariatullah reached proficieny in these two languages in two years.

Following this, Shariatullah then headed north to Murshidabad to meet with his uncle, Ashiq Miyan, who was working in the district as a court official. Shariatullah continued to enhance his proficiency in the two languages during the twelve months he spent with his uncle and aunt. Upon the decision of his uncle and aunt, they set off to visit their ancestral village in Shamail which Shariatullah had not visited since he ran away at the age of twelve. During the journey, a vigorous storm broke down the small sailboat resulting in the martyrdom of Shariatullah's uncle and aunt. Shariatullah was so disturbed by this calamity that he headed back to Calcutta returning to his teacher, Basharat Ali.

Migration to Arabia
By the time Shariatullah returned to his teacher Basharat Ali in Calcutta, Ali had become so concerned by the British colonial rule that he had made the decision to emigrate to Arabia, home to Makkah and Madinah - the two most holiest sites in Islam. Shariatullah also expressed his strong desire of accompanying him, and was given permission by Ali to join the journey to Arabia in 1799. Shariatullah's first stay in Makkah lasted until 1818 and significantly enhanced his familiarity with Islam and impassioned him even more to enhance his knowledge and understanding on the religion.

The time he spent in Arabia is generally divided into three distinct phases. During the first two years, Shariatullah stayed in the home of Mawlana Murad, a Bengali Muslim migrant who permanently resided in Makkah. Shariatullah studied Arabic literature and fiqh during his time with Murad. The second phase of his stay was the most notable and spanned over a 14-year time period in which Shariatullah studied under a prominent Hanafi jurist known as Tahir al-Sumbal Makki where he was introduced to tasawwuf and the Qadiriyya. In the third phase, Shariatullah sought permission from Makki to go and study Islamic philosophy at Al-Azhar University in Islamic Cairo. It is reported that permission was ultimately granted with reluctance, possibly due to a fear of rationalism. It has not been confirmed whether Shariatullah officially enrolled in any courses at the university though he is said to have spent long hours at the university's library.

Return to Bengal and the Faraizi Movement
According to James Wise and Hidayet Hosain, Shariatullah came back to Bengal from Arabia as a skilled scholar of Islam and Arabic. Upon his return, he had a long beard and wore a turban at all times, something indicative of his strong commitment to all authentic teachings of Islam. When he first visited his uncle Azim al-Din's house in Shamail, no one was able to identify him for his change in appearance.

Soon after, his uncle died and reportedly requested him to take care of the family as he had no male heir. Shariatullah was unable to attend his uncle's funeral due to disagreements he had with the local villagers on the manner in which the Islamic funeral had to be conducted. On another occasion, Shariatullah made the call to prayer for Maghrib, to which no one showed up for. He became concerned after finding that many Muslims were indulging in superstitious and Hindu-influenced practices which he viewed as un-Islamic. Thereafter, he began propagating Islam to the Muslim community of Bengal and India. These series of events encouraged him to play his role in guiding the local Muslim population to what he believed to be the pure Islam. This struggle, founded in 1818, came to be known as the Faraizi Movement. Surprisingly, Shariatullah faced a lot of opposition from the Muslim elites in Bengal who also tried to entrap him into legal matters. Following the initial failure of his propagatory activities, Shariatullah decided to return to Makkah.

It is believed that this trip took place somewhere between 1818 and 1820. Shariatullah believed that his efforts of purifying Islam in Bengal had met failure because he had not formally requested permission from his teacher Tahir al-Sumbal Makki for moving ahead with this step in his life. This is clearly indicative of the impact his teachers had on his life, and the high degree of respect he had for them. It is also reported but has never been confirmed that a turning point in his struggles for purifying Islam was a dream that he had of Prophet Muhammad during this stay. According to the unconfirmed accounts, Shariatullah was encouraged in the dream to purify Islam in his homeland. As a result, he returned to Bengal in circa 1821 with much more enthusiasm and passion than during his prior visit.

Though founded in 1818, the Faraizi Movement became popular and well known in Bengal, following his second attempt in 1821. Durr-i-Muhammad describes the impact of Faraizi movement in the words “All these bidat were then abolished and the sun of Islam rose high in the sky”. Hunter takes a similar stand by saying “Having arrived there Haji Shariatullah propagated (true) religion throughout Bengal”. An example of one tradition would be the planting of a banana tree when a woman menstruates for the first time. Shariatullah wanted the Muslims to focus on the teachings of the Quran in an orthodox manner, and he effectively devoted the later portion of his life towards his movement. The beliefs of Haji Shariatullah had a significant overlap with those of Wahhabism and continue to be very popular to date.

Teachings
Shariatullah's Faraizi movement focused on reforming the priorities of Bengali Muslims based on the Hanafi school of Islamic jurisprudence. It called for Muslims to recognise and partake in their compulsory duties (fard); one example being the five daily prayers.  He instructed his followers to assimilate every religious duty required by the Quran and Sunnah. He called for observance of the five pillars, the complete acceptance and observance of tawhid and prohibited all digressions from the original doctrines of Islam such as shirk (polytheism) and bidʻah (innovation).

The movement also fought for the rights of Muslims under the colonial rule; deeming British domination as detrimental to the religious life of Muslims. It branched on to becoming not just a religious but also a socio-economic issue, when some of the elites, mainly Muslim and Hindu zamindars, attempted to entrap Shariatullah into legal matters. This was upon their disagreement with the ways he was propagating his beliefs, especially regarding his disagreement to paying non-Islamic taxes and the slaughtering of cows.

Reception
The Faraizi Movement was very popular in its time among the general population and its remnants remain very popular to date. It began to circulate with astonishing speed from Madaripur to the districts of Dacca, Faridpur, Backergunge, Mymensingh and Comilla. Some wealthy Bengalis on the other hand, particularly the landlords of Dhaka, hence, reacted sharply against him and this caused a riot in Noyabari, Dacca. The reaction of these landlords, both Muslim and Hindu, as well as European indigo planters, caused the movement to become a socio-economic issue.

Gradually, incidents caused by the Faraizi movement could be witnessed in various parts of Bengal. The outraged landlords built up a propaganda campaign with the British officials, incriminating the Faraizis with mutinous mood. In 1837, these Hindu landlords accused Shariatullah of attempting to build up a monarchy of his own, similar in lines to Titumir. They also brought several lawsuits against the Faraizis, in which they benefitted dynamic cooperation of the European indigo planters. Shariatullah was placed under the detention of the police in more than one instance, for purportedly inciting agrarian turbulences in Faridpur.

Death and legacy 
“Haji Shariatullah died at his native village Shamail in 1840 at the age of 59” and was buried in the backyard of his home. His grave was washed away in a flooding of his home, but his tomb inscription has been preserved by the Asiatic Society of Pakistan. After his death, the Faraizi Movement was led by Dudu Miyan, Haji Shariatullah's only son and child.

Shariatullah remains one of the most celebrated and prominent Muslim reformers to date, especially amongst the category of those who pertain to the history of Islamic leaders in the Indian sub-continent. He is very well known and acknowledged by Muslim communities of Bangladesh, India, and Pakistan with his Faraizi Movement as being the epitome of his legacy and services. Details about Faraizi Movement can be found in common school textbooks as well as in Islamic historical books.  After the death of Haji Shariatullah in 1840, leadership of the Faraizi movement passed to his only son, Muhsinuddin Ahmad popularly known as Dudu Miyan.

Palong thana of Madaripur, a district in the Dhaka Division of Bangladesh, was named Shariatpur District in honor of Haji Shariatullah.

Bangladesh issued a postage stamp commemorating him on 10 March 1993.

As of 2005, the  Haji Shariatullah Bridge over the Arial Khan River on the Mawa-Bhanga highway in Shibchar is named after him.

A biography film was made in Bangladesh titled Haji Shariatullah directed by Hafizuddin and portrayed by Ilias Kanchan.

References

Bengali Muslim scholars of Islam
1781 births
Indian revolutionaries
1840 deaths
18th-century Bengalis
19th-century Bengalis
18th-century Indian Muslims
19th-century Indian educators
18th-century landowners
19th-century landowners
19th-century Indian Muslims
People from Madaripur District
19th-century Muslim theologians
Sunni Muslim scholars of Islam
Hanafis